Podunk is a hamlet located along Taughannock Creek in the town of Ulysses, Tompkins County, New York, United States, just south of Trumansburg.

References

External links
History: Town of Ulysses, ulysses.ny.us; accessed 26 June 2014. 

Hamlets in New York (state)
Hamlets in Tompkins County, New York